Highway 397 is a highway in the Canadian province of Saskatchewan. It runs from Highway 763/Highway 764 at Allan to Highway 16.

Major intersections
From south to north. The entire route is in Rural Municipality of Blucher No. 343.

References

397